Ptychidio longibarbus is a species of cyprinid of the genus Ptychidio.

References

Cyprinid fish of Asia
Freshwater fish of China